The 2022 IIHF World U18 Championship Division III was two international under-18 men's ice hockey tournaments organized by the International Ice Hockey Federation. The group A and B tournaments were the sixth and seventh level of competition at the 2022 IIHF World U18 Championships.

Division III A

The Division III A tournament was played in Istanbul, Turkey, from 11 to 17 April 2022.

Participants

Match officials
Three referees and seven linesmen were selected for the tournament.

Standings

Results

All times are local (UTC+3).

Division III B

The Division III B tournament was played in Sarajevo, Bosnia and Herzegovina, from 17 to 22 April 2022.

Participants

Match officials
Two referees and three linesmen were selected for the tournament.

Standings

Results
All times are local (UTC+2).

References

IIHF World U18 Championship Division III
Division III
International ice hockey competitions hosted by Turkey
International ice hockey competitions hosted by Bosnia and Herzegovina
Sports competitions in Istanbul
Sports competitions in Sarajevo
IIHF
IIHF